Maharaja Lakshman Sen Memorial College Ground is a cricket ground in Sundar Nagar, Himachal Pradesh, India.  The first recorded match held on the ground came in 1991 when Himachal Pradesh Under-19s played Delhi Under-19s.  The ground later held a List A match in 1997 when Himachal Pradesh played the Services in the 1997/98 Ranji Trophy one-day competition.  Following this match, a first-class match was played there between the two sides in the Ranji Trophy.

References

External links
Maharaja Lakshman Sen Memorial College Ground at ESPNcricinfo
Maharaja Lakshman Sen Memorial College Ground at CricketArchive

Cricket grounds in Himachal Pradesh
Buildings and structures in Mandi district
University sports venues in India
Defunct cricket grounds in India
1991 establishments in Himachal Pradesh
Sports venues completed in 1991
20th-century architecture in India